Moscow City Duma District 45 is one of 45 constituencies in Moscow City Duma. The constituency covers eastern part of Central Moscow as well as Sokolniki. District 45 was created in 2013, after Moscow City Duma had been expanded from 35 to 45 seats.

Members elected

Election results

2014

|-
! colspan=2 style="background-color:#E9E9E9;text-align:left;vertical-align:top;" |Candidate
! style="background-color:#E9E9E9;text-align:left;vertical-align:top;" |Party
! style="background-color:#E9E9E9;text-align:right;" |Votes
! style="background-color:#E9E9E9;text-align:right;" |%
|-
|style="background-color: "|
|align=left|Yaroslav Kuzminov
|align=left|Independent
|
|40.99%
|-
|style="background-color:"|
|align=left|Yelena Fomicheva
|align=left|Communist Party
|
|23.42%
|-
|style="background-color:"|
|align=left|Nikolay Kavkazsky
|align=left|Yabloko
|
|12.78%
|-
|style="background-color:"|
|align=left|Kristina Simonyan
|align=left|A Just Russia
|
|11.24%
|-
|style="background-color:"|
|align=left|Anton Umnikov
|align=left|Liberal Democratic Party
|
|3.93%
|-
|style="background-color:"|
|align=left|Anton Komendantov
|align=left|Independent
|
|2.50%
|-
|style="background-color:"|
|align=left|Barbara Babich
|align=left|Independent
|
|2.24%
|-
| colspan="5" style="background-color:#E9E9E9;"|
|- style="font-weight:bold"
| colspan="3" style="text-align:left;" | Total
| 
| 100%
|-
| colspan="5" style="background-color:#E9E9E9;"|
|- style="font-weight:bold"
| colspan="4" |Source:
|
|}

2019

|-
! colspan=2 style="background-color:#E9E9E9;text-align:left;vertical-align:top;" |Candidate
! style="background-color:#E9E9E9;text-align:left;vertical-align:top;" |Party
! style="background-color:#E9E9E9;text-align:right;" |Votes
! style="background-color:#E9E9E9;text-align:right;" |%
|-
|style="background-color:"|
|align=left|Magomet Yandiyev
|align=left|A Just Russia
|
|38.09%
|-
|style="background-color:"|
|align=left|Valeria Kasamara
|align=left|Independent
|
|32.42%
|-
|style="background-color:"|
|align=left|Yevgeny Turushev
|align=left|Liberal Democratic Party
|
|12.14%
|-
|style="background-color:"|
|align=left|Mikhail Konev
|align=left|Independent
|
|9.90%
|-
| colspan="5" style="background-color:#E9E9E9;"|
|- style="font-weight:bold"
| colspan="3" style="text-align:left;" | Total
| 
| 100%
|-
| colspan="5" style="background-color:#E9E9E9;"|
|- style="font-weight:bold"
| colspan="4" |Source:
|
|}

References

Moscow City Duma districts